Attack on Fear is a 1984 American made-for-television drama film directed by Mel Damski and starring Paul Michael Glaser, Linda Kelsey, Kevin Conway and Barbara Babcock. It premiered on CBS on October 10, 1984. The teleplay by T.S. Cook is based on the 1980 book The Light on Synanon: How a Country Weekly Exposed a Corporate Cult written by Dave Mitchell, Cathy Mitchell and Richard Ofshe.

Overview
Paul Michael Glaser and Linda Kelsey portray Dave and Cathy Mitchell, the new owners of a small-circulation weekly newspaper called The Point Reyes Light in Marin County, California. Upon hearing of iniquities at the famed Santa Monica drug rehabilitation center Synanon, the Mitchells begin publishing their evidence. Despite legal pressure from Synanon and bizarre anonymously mailed threats, the Mitchells' story results in a major investigation of the revered institution.

Although Attack on Fear was completed in 1982, it was not telecast until October 1984 and then only after being reshaped to satisfy Synanon's battery of attorneys.

Cast
Paul Michael Glaser - Dave Mitchell
Linda Kelsey - Cathy Mitchell
Kevin Conway - Richard Ofshe
John Harkins - Banner
Alan Fudge - Art Disterhoft
Barbara Babcock - Jane Dutton
Tom Villard - Keith
Jerry Hardin - Sheriff Bergus
Hugh Reilly - Lofgren
Wendy Goldman - Gail
Jack Gregory - Thompkins
Patricia E. Parris - Bonnie
Gary Bayer - Veteran Reporter
Michael Mallory - SWAT Officer

References

External links

1984 films
1984 television films
1984 drama films
CBS network films
1980s English-language films
Films set in 1978
Films set in the San Francisco Bay Area
Biographical films about journalists
Films directed by Mel Damski
American drama television films
1980s American films